Embassy of the Republic of Latvia in Moscow is the chief diplomatic mission of Latvia in the Russian Federation. It is located at 3 Chaplygina Street in the Basmanny District of Moscow.

Closed from 21 of April 2022.

History
The building of the embassy is the former mansion of Lev Vladimirovich Gautier-Dufayer, a merchant in the Russian Empire, built in 1898. The estate was nationalised after the October Revolution and transferred to Latvia in 1921 following the Latvian–Soviet Peace Treaty and the establishment of diplomatic relations between Latvia and Soviet Russia.

During the Soviet occupation of Latvia, the building served as the representation of the Latvian SSR at the central government of the Soviet Union.

In 1992, after restoration of independence of Latvia, the representation was again transformed into the embassy of Latvia.

Latvian ambassadors in Moscow

Representatives to Soviet Russia and the USSR (1920–1940)
 Jānis Vesmanis (1920–1921; with Soviet Russia)
 Ēriks Mārtiņš Feldmanis (1921–1923)
 Kārlis Ozols (1923–1929)
 Jānis Seskis (1929–1932)
 Alfrēds Bīlmanis (1932–1935)
 Roberts Liepiņš (1935–1936)
 Fricis Vilhelms Kociņš (1936–1940)

Ambassadors in the Russian Federation (from 1991)
 Jānis Peters (1991–1997)
 Imants Daudišs (1997–2001)
 Normans Penke (2001–2004)
 Andris Teikmanis (2005–2008)
 Edgars Skuja (2009–2013)
 Astra Kurme (2013–2017)
 Māris Riekstiņš (since 2017)

See also 
 Latvia–Russia relations
 Diplomatic missions in Russia

References

External links 
 Embassy of Latvia in Moscow  

Latvia–Russia relations
Latvia
Moscow